Ian O'Connor (born 1969) is an American sportswriter who is the author of four books, including The New York Times bestsellers Belichick: The Making of the Greatest Football Coach of All Time; Arnie & Jack: Palmer, Nicklaus, and Golf's Greatest Rivalry; and The Captain: The Journey of Derek Jeter.

Early life and education
Raised in Englewood, New Jersey, O'Connor graduated from St. Cecilia High School in 1982. He earned a bachelor's degree from Marist College in 1986.

Career 
O'Connor is a columnist and senior writer for ESPN.com. He was previously a columnist at the New York Daily News, USA Today, The Journal News, The Record, and Foxsports.com, and also authored the books entitled The Jump: Sebastian Telfair and the High Stakes Business of High School Ball. and Coach K: The Rise and Reign of Mike Krzyzewski.

O'Connor has finished in first place in more than 15 national writing contests conducted by the Golf Writers Association of America, the Associated Press Sports Editors, the Football Writers Association of America, the National Association of Black Journalists, the United States Basketball Writers Association, and the Society of Professional Journalists' Sigma Delta Chi Award at the National Press Club in Washington, D.C.

O'Connor is a former reporter for The National Sports Daily and the former host of weekly WEPN-FM and national ESPN Radio shows.

Personal life 
He lives in New Jersey.

References

External links
 https://www.ian-oconnor.com/

American sportswriters
Living people
Marist College alumni
People from Englewood, New Jersey
People from River Vale, New Jersey
St. Cecilia High School (New Jersey) alumni
Writers from New Jersey
Year of birth missing (living people)